Martin Morrissey may refer to:

 Marty Morrissey (born 1958), Irish sports commentator and television presenter
 Martin Óg Morrissey (born 1934), Irish former sportsperson